Dalan Ancrum (born May 26, 1996) is an American professional basketball player.

High school career
Ancrum played basketball for Westwood High School in Austin, Texas. As a senior, he averaged 18.6 points, 6.6 rebounds, 2.3 assists and 2.1 steals per game. During his two seasons in high school, he Tabbed All-District First Team honors in both seasons.

College career
During his college career, Ancrum played for Western Illinois. As a senior, he had his best season with the Leathernecks, averaging 13.5 points, 5.3 rebounds, 1.8 assists and 1 steal per game.

Professional career
After going undrafted in the 2018 NBA draft, Ancrum signed his first professional contract with Al-Arabi of the Qatari Basketball League. In 3 games, Ancrum averaged 16.3 points and 5.3 rebounds per game.  On August 12, 2020, he signed with Enosis Neon Paralimni of the Cypriot League. After a successful first season, he re-signed with Paralimni for another season. Ancrum joined Pallacanestro Chieti of the Serie A2 Basket in 2021. On January 11, 2022, Ancrum signed with BKM Lučenec of the Slovak Basketball League.

Personal
His father is former player David Ancrum.

References

External links
Western Illinois Leathernecks bio

1996 births
Living people
American men's basketball players
Small forwards
American expatriate basketball people in Cyprus
American expatriate basketball people in Qatar
People from Round Rock, Texas
Basketball players from Texas